Trogiidae is a family of granary booklice in the order Psocodea (formerly Psocoptera). There are about 11 genera and more than 50 described species in Trogiidae.

Genera
These 11 genera belong to the family Trogiidae:
 Anomocopeus Badonnel, 1967
 Cerobasis Kolbe, 1882
 Helenatropos Lienhard, 2005
 Helminotrogia Li, 2002
 Lepinotus Heyden, 1850
 Myrmicodipnella Enderlein, 1909
 Phlebotrogia Li, 2002
 Spinatropos Lienhard, 2000
 Trogium Illiger, 1798
†Cretolepinotus Cockx et al. 2020 Canadian amber, Wapiti Formation, Campanian
 † Eolepinotus Vishnyakova, 1975 Taimyr amber, Russia, Santonian
 † Paralepinotus Azar et al., 2018 Fushun amber, China, Ypresian

References

Further reading

External links

 

 
Trogiomorpha
Articles created by Qbugbot